Mothermania (1969), subtitled The Best of the Mothers, is a compilation album by the Mothers of Invention. While the songs were previously released on Freak Out!, Absolutely Free and We're Only in It for the Money, it contains unique mixes or edits made specifically for this compilation.

Background 

After the Mothers of Invention's contract with MGM and Verve Records expired, Frank Zappa and Herb Cohen negotiated to form a semi-independent record label Bizarre Records, with Verve releasing three Bizarre releases with distribution by MGM: a new Mothers of Invention album, Cruising with Ruben & the Jets, the compilation Mothermania, and an album by Sandy Hurvitz, Sandy's Album is Here at Last. Mothermania was prepared in order to recoup money which Verve felt it lost funding the Mothers of Invention albums Freak Out!, Absolutely Free and We're Only in It for the Money. Frank Zappa prepared the masters for the release, remixing and sequencing the track listing, as well as overseeing its packaging. The compilation was notable for featuring unique mixes or edits of the songs compiled for its release, including an uncensored version of "Mother People", which previously appeared on We're Only in It for the Money in a censored version, and a radically different mix of "The Idiot Bastard Son".

Release, reception and aftermath 

Mothermania was released shortly before the release of the Mothers of Invention's fifth studio album, Uncle Meat, a releasing tactic that Frank Zappa felt was intentional on the behalf of Verve. Zappa subsequently disowned the compilation following its release. Allmusic reviewer William Ruhlmann described the compilation as being "redundant", giving it three out of five stars. Verve would go on to produce further compilations, beginning with The **** of the Mothers which was released in the fall of 1969, without Zappa's involvement.

The album was unavailable for a long time, but has since been officially reissued as a digital download in 2009 and on CD in 2012.

Reissued on Zappa Records in 2019

Track listing

Personnel 
 Frank Zappa
 Jimmy Carl Black
 Roy Estrada
 Ray Collins
 Elliot Ingber
 Billy Mundi
 Don Preston
 Bunk Gardner
 Jim Fielder
 Ian Underwood
 Euclid James "Motorhead" Sherwood

Art Tripp appears in the album cover but he didn't play on any of the songs (Freak Out!, Absolutely Free and We're Only in it for the Money were recorded before he joined the band).

Production 
 Producers: Frank Zappa, Tom Wilson
 Director of engineering: Val Valentin
 Engineer: Ami Hadani, Tom Hidley, Gary Kelgren and Dick Kunc.
 Arranger: Frank Zappa
 Cover design: Cal Schenkel

References 

1969 compilation albums
Albums conducted by Frank Zappa
Bizarre Records compilation albums
Frank Zappa compilation albums
The Mothers of Invention albums
Verve Records compilation albums
Albums produced by Frank Zappa
Albums produced by Tom Wilson (record producer)